Commonwealth Financial Network is a privately held Registered Investment Adviser–independent broker/dealer based in Waltham, Massachusetts, and 110 Plaza in San Diego, California. The company was founded in 1979 by Joseph S. Deitch and was incorporated under the name Commonwealth Equity Services. In 1999, the name Commonwealth Financial Network was adopted. As of 2017, Deitch remains Chairman of the firm. The firm is owned and controlled by its 13 managing principals.

Commonwealth has approximately 1,950 independent financial advisers and financial planners for whom it serves as a "back office", processing investment transactions on behalf of their clients, and to whom the firm provides resources and consulting services to support the advisors' businesses.

Advisors who affiliate with the firm must earn a minimum of $200,000 in annual gross broker/dealer concessions (GDC). Gross revenue per advisor in 2017 was the highest among independent broker/dealers, as reported by Financial Advisor in April 2017.

History

References

Financial services companies of the United States
Financial services companies established in 1979
Privately held companies based in Massachusetts
Companies based in Waltham, Massachusetts
Brokerage firms